Sankaranarayana Iyer Ganesa Iyer, commonly named as S Ganesa Iyer was 8th descendant of Subbayyan Dalawa. He was born in Varkala.

Career
He started as a teacher and subsequently rose to the position of Deputy Director of Public Instruction, Kerala. While he was the headmaster of Cherthala high school, the then Director of public instruction, Venkiteswara Iyer accepted his idea of conducting a state level school youth festival and entrusted him with the job of conducting the first one of its kind, in Thiruvananthapuram. This was taken forward and today the Kerala State Youth Festival is the biggest school children's art festival of the World.

Post-retirement
He took keen interest in the classical arts of Kerala with a focus on Kathakali, Koodiyattam and Carnatic Classical Music. He was one of the three founder Directors of Margi in Thiruvananthapuram. The trio included Rama P. Iyer and D Appukkuttan Nair. He used to write the Aattaprakaaram; a detailing of the performance of characters in Kathakali, for various Attakatha and used to get it performed in Margi. His work on Kathakali won the award from Kerala Kalamandalam. He is the co-author of the first book on Kathakali in French with his disciple Martine Chemana Kendra Sahitya Academy , India has published a book authored by him, which was a collection of abridged form of selected works of notable Malayalam littérateur.

References

1912 births
2005 deaths
Koodiyattam exponents
People from Varkala
Kathakali exponents
20th-century Indian dancers
Dancers from Kerala
Indian male dancers